Dakowy Suche  is a village in the administrative district of Gmina Buk, within Poznań County, Greater Poland Voivodeship, in west-central Poland.

The village has a population of 420.

References

Dakowy Suche